Aquila (Italian for "Eagle") was an Italian aircraft carrier converted from the trans-Atlantic passenger liner . During World War II, Work on Aquila began in late 1941 at the Ansaldo shipyard in Genoa and continued for the next two years. With the signing of the Italian armistice on 8 September 1943, however, all work was halted and the vessel remained unfinished. Aquila was eventually scrapped in 1952.

Genesis
Aquila was Italy's first aircraft carrier project; it was not built from the keel up as such, and was never completed.

Following World War I, the Italian Royal Navy (Regia Marina) began exploring the use of ship-borne aircraft by converting the merchant ship Città di Messina into the twin-catapult-equipped seaplane tender Giuseppe Miraglia. Commissioned in 1927, the ship could carry as many as four large and 16 medium seaplanes and was primarily used as an experimental catapult ship for most of her career. By 1940, she was designated an aircraft transport/training ship and functioned as a seaplane tender for Italian capital ships.

Throughout the 1920s and 1930s, Italian military and political circles vigorously debated the role and necessity of aircraft carriers in the expanding Italian fleet. Gino Ducci (Regia Marina chief of staff in the early 1920s), Romeo Bernotti (assistant chief of staff) and naval officer Giuseppe Fioravanzo all championed development of a fleet air arm, the building of aircraft carriers and consolidation of the air and naval academies. Other factions opposed these ideas, especially carrier construction, not so much on the grounds of military usefulness, but rather on cost and practicality. More than anything else, Italy's limited industrial capacity, inadequate shipyard space and lack of financial capital prevented her from building the kind of well-balanced fleet envisioned by her naval theorists. Priority went to those ships deemed most necessary in a future conflict.

Since France was considered Italy's most likely foe in another European war, keeping parity with her navy became a paramount concern. Between 1932 and 1937, the French Navy laid down four new capital ships: (Dunkerque, Strasbourg, Richelieu, and Jean Bart). This caused dictator Benito Mussolini and the Italian admiralty to scrap any plans for carrier construction. Instead, Italy modernized two older battleships (Cavour and Cesare in 1933), and began construction of two new ones (Vittorio Veneto and Littorio in 1934).

Because the Regia Marina was expected to operate primarily in the relatively narrow confines of the Mediterranean and not on the world's oceans, the navy's lack of a fleet air arm seemed a tolerable omission (especially given that carriers were an expensive and unproven commodity at the time). The Italian mainland and islands such as Pantelleria and Sicily were viewed as natural aircraft carriers, whose many airbases, operated by the Italian Air Force (Regia Aeronautica), could provide adequate fleet air coverage when requested by the navy.

On 7 January 1941, less than two months after the successful British carrier raid on Taranto, Mussolini authorized a much more ambitious and extensive conversion of Roma into a full fleet carrier, capable of operating a larger air group and of keeping pace with the Regia Marina′s faster battleships and heavy cruisers.

By 27 January, however, the order was just as quickly rescinded following numerous objections from the Regia Marina. These included excessive cost; technical obstacles involving development of catapults, arrester gear and elevators; an estimated two-year development time for folding-wing aircraft; the time needed for studying the effects of air turbulence over the flight deck from an island superstructure; problems the Germans were encountering in the construction of their own aircraft carrier, ; and recent accounts of the heavy damage inflicted by German dive bombers on the British carrier Illustrious, graphically demonstrating the vulnerability of carriers operating in the Mediterranean.

Then, on 21 June, three months after losing three heavy cruisers off Cape Matapan, a loss potentially preventable had the Italians possessed their own aircraft carrier, the Regia Marina and Regia Aeronautica finally agreed to proceed with Roma′s conversion.

Design and construction
Work on converting Roma into an aircraft carrier began in earnest at Cantieri Ansaldo, Genoa, in November 1941. Since a battleship named  was already under construction, the ship's name was changed to Aquila.

Hull

The liner's interior was completely gutted to allow for replacement of the original machinery and the addition of a hangar deck and workshops. Deep bulges were added to either side of the hull to improve stability, hull form, and provide a modest degree of torpedo defense. A layer of reinforced concrete— thick—was applied inboard of the bulges for splinter protection. The hull was also lengthened to take advantage of the increased power of Aquila′s new machinery, and the bow flare increased to increase seaworthiness and provide additional space for air requirements. In order improve resistance to underwater damage, the ship was heavily subdivided with 18 watertight bulkheads extending up to 'C' or 'D' deck, 11 of which were double.

The fuel tanks copied British practice and consisted of cylinders or coffer dams separated from the ship's hull by water-filled compartments. This was a safety measure intended to prevent fracturing of the fuel system and the inadvertent spread of volatile AvGas fumes due to severe vibration or "whip" from bomb hits, near misses and torpedo hits.   armor was applied on external plating to protect the steering gears.

Machinery
Self-propulsion tests at the Freude tank at La Spezia in January 1942 indicated that for a trial displacement of 26,700 tons, a speed of 29 knots could be achieved with 132,660 shp. This indicated that a sustained speed of 29.5 knots could be reached with an output of 140,000 shp, and 30 knots if the propulsion system could develop 151,000 shp without being forced.

Aquila′s new propulsion system was taken from two canceled Capitani Romani-class light cruisers (Cornelio Silla and Paolo Emilio), as despite their cancellation the fabrication of their propulsion systems was in an advanced stage. Totaling eight boilers and four turbine groups, each of these was capable of generating 55,000 shp at 310 rpm, more than adequate for the needs of Aquila. As installed on Aquila, the overall output in shaft horsepower was reduced, to a maximum of 37,750 shp per turbine group at full normal power.

In order to increase survivability, the propulsion systems were grouped into four engine rooms, each with one turbine group and two boilers -  a similar solution to what the Americans adopted for the North Carolina-class battleships. This solution made it possible to simplify piping of all kinds (steam, water, oil, etc.), ventilation systems, improve living conditions for the crew, and enhance ease of supervision and maintenance. Each room was separated from adjacent spaces by double watertight bulkheads, which increased structural strength and reduced the possibility of a single torpedo hit disabling two engine rooms at a time.

The system as a whole was capable of generating , and Aquila was expected to reach  on trials and  when fully laden. At a displacement of 27,800 tons, maximum fuel supply was 2,800 tons, and operational range 4,150 nmi at 18 kn and 1,210 nmi at 29 kn. With maximum fuel load, 3,660 tons, Aquila would displace 28,800 tons, with a range of 5,500 nmi at 18 kn and 1,580 nmi at 29 kn.

Hangar 
This space was divided into four sections by five fire doors, section length from fore to aft being 32, 25, 25, and 35 meters. Hangar floor capacity was 26 aircraft for the Re.2001 OR Serie II, with seven in the 32-35 meter sections and six in the 25 meter sections. Additionally, fifteen aircraft could be suspended from the hangar ceiling. A planned folding-wing version of the aircraft was to have allowed the stowage of sixty-six aircraft in the hangar.

Flight deck
Aquila had a single continuous  flight deck. It was partially armored with  plate over the gasoline bunkers and magazines. The flight deck ended short of the bows but overhung the stern, where it featured a pronounced round-down to improve air flow. Two  octagonal lifts with a  capacity enabled transfer of aircraft between the hangar deck and flight deck. One was directly amidships and the second another  forward, thus placing them far enough from the aft arrester wires that both could be used for striking down aircraft into the hangar immediately after a landing.

Two German-supplied Demag compressed air-driven catapults, each capable of launching one aircraft every 30 seconds, were installed parallel to each other at the forward end of the flight deck. These were originally intended for Germany's own "Carrier B", Graf Zeppelin′s incomplete—and eventually scrapped—sister ship. The Italians obtained them—along with five sets of arrester gear and other component plans—during a naval technical mission to Germany in October–November 1941.

A set of rails led aft from the catapults to the elevators and into the hangars. For catapult-assisted launches, aircraft would be hoisted in the hangar onto a portable collapsible catapult carriage, raised on the elevators to flight deck level and then trundled forward on the rails to the catapult starting positions, the same system as employed on Graf Zeppelin.

Aquila′s engines and catapults were successfully tested in August 1943 but the arresting gear installed on the carrier, consisting of four cables, initially failed to work properly. This would have prevented aircraft, once launched, from landing back on board. It was therefore proposed that aircraft taking off from Aquila would, after performing their mission, fly back to the nearest land-based airfield or simply ditch in the sea, a serious and embarrassing limitation on her capabilities as a fleet carrier. Italian and German technicians labored for months at the Perugia Sant'Egidio airfield on a mock-up of Aquila's flight deck and by March 1943 the heavily modified arresting gear was deemed usable. A postwar US Navy evaluation concluded, however, that the arrangement would have made landings exceedingly hazardous, especially given the absence of a crash barrier.

Aquila′s starboard-side island contained a single large vertical funnel for carrying exhaust gases clear of the flight deck. It also included a tall command tower and the fire control directors for the  guns.

Anti-aircraft armament
Six 6-barrelled /65 caliber (cal) anti-aircraft (AA) cannons were positioned just fore and aft on the island. In addition, Aquila carried eight /45 cal guns taken from one of the canceled Capitani Romani-class cruisers. Though not designed as dual purpose weapons, these guns had an elevation of 45° and were therefore capable of providing a useful barrage against attacking enemy aircraft (by comparison, Italy's best heavy AA gun—the /50 cal—had an elevation of 85°). It was intended to mount 12 newly designed  AA guns on sponsons just below flight deck level (six on either side of the hull). However, this gun—with an automatic feeder and 20 rpm rate of fire—never got beyond prototype stage. An additional 16 six-barrelled 20 mm cannons—also mounted below the flight deck—rounded out the ship's AA defense.

Aircraft
Throughout 1942 and 1943, trials were conducted at Perugia and Guidonia—the Regia Aeronautica′s equivalent to the German Luftwaffe′s test facility at Rechlin—to find aircraft suitable for conversion to carrier use. The Italians selected the SAIMAN 200, Fiat G.50/B and Reggiane Re.2001 OR Serie II as potential candidates.

In March 1943, German engineers and instructors with experience on Graf Zeppelin arrived to advise on aircraft testing and to help train future carrier pilots culled from 160 Gruppo C.T. of the Regia Aeronautica. They brought with them examples of a Junkers Ju 87C Stuka dive bomber (a navalized version with folding wings, arrester hook and catapult attachment points) and an Arado Ar 96B single-engine trainer. After conducting comparative flight trials, the Italians eventually settled on the Re.2001 as their standard carrier fighter/fighter-bomber and even the Germans concluded it had better potential than their own counterpart, the Messerschmitt Bf 109T. All flight testing—including simulated braked deck landings—was land-based.

Aquila′s planned air complement was 51 non-folding Reggiane Re.2001 OR fighter-bombers: 41 stowed in the hangar deck (including 15 suspended from the deck head) and 10 on the flight deck in a permanent deck park. A folding-wing version of the Re.2001 was planned, which would have increased the size of Aquila′s air group to 66 aircraft, but this never materialized. Only 10 Re.2001s were fully converted for carrier use. They were given tail hooks, RTG naval radio equipment and bomb racks for carrying  of bombs. They were also armed with two  Breda-SAFAT machine guns mounted above the engine cowling. At least one Re.2001G was under test at Perugia as a naval torpedo bomber and was given a lengthened tail wheel strut to accommodate the added height of a torpedo suspended below the fuselage.

Fate
Aquila was nearing completion and had passed her first static test when Italy surrendered to the Allies on 8 September 1943. Germany then seized the ship and placed it under guard. Aquila was later damaged on 16 June 1944, during an Allied air attack on Genoa. Near the end of the war, the Italian "co-belligerent" government  feared the Germans might use Aquila as a blockship in the entrance to Genoa harbor. They sent divers from the former Decima Flottiglia MAS, who on 19 April 1945 partially scuttled Aquila in a harmless location.

Raised in 1946, Aquila was later towed to La Spezia in 1949. Consideration was given to completing her or converting her to some other use. She was eventually scrapped in 1952.

See also 
 Italian aircraft carrier Sparviero

References

Bibliography

External links

Portaerei Aquila – Plancia di Comando
 Aquila Marina Militare website

Ships built in Genoa
1941 ships
Aircraft carriers of the Regia Marina
World War II aircraft carriers of Italy
Naval ships of Italy captured by Germany during World War II
Maritime incidents in April 1945
Ships built by Gio. Ansaldo & C.
Proposed aircraft carriers